RoundGlass Punjab FC Reserves and Academy are the reserve team and youth system of I-League club Punjab F.C. Based in Mohali, Punjab, the reserve side participates in the I-League 2nd Division, the second division of Indian football. The youth system of the club has a residential academy composed of teams from three age groups that participates in the various division in the Elite youth league system.

Reserves
Punjab FC Reserves was formed on 2019 and they participated in the I-League 2nd Division for the first time in the 2019–20 season, thus becoming the first I-League team to have a reserve team in the I-League 2nd Division. Their first ever match in the I-League 2nd Division was against AU Rajasthan FC which they won by a score of 2–0 owing to a brace from Himanshu Jangra.

Current squad

Season-by-season

Academy
Founded as Minerva Academy in 2005, it became a fully professional club in 2013 establishing as Minerva Punjab FC. The club was purchased by Rounglass in 2020 and was renamed to Punjab FC. The club's academy is one of the most successful football academies in India.

Many promising youngsters had graduated from the club's academy. In June 2020 Minerva Academy was recommended for Rashtriya Khel Protsahan Puraskar for producing more than 70 players for the various Indian national football sides.

Noted graduates
Jeakson Singh Thounaojam
Dheeraj Singh Moirangthem
Givson Singh
Amarjit Singh Kiyam

Honours

Honours
as Minerva Punjab FC

 Youth League U18
Champions (1): 2018–19
 JSW U-18 Youth Cup
Winners (1): 2022
 Youth League U-15
Champions (4): 2015–16, 2016–17, 2017–18, 2018–19
Youth I-league
Champions (1): 2017–18
 JSW U-13 Youth Cup
Winners (1): 2022
KBN Youth Cup
Winners (1): 2022

References

Association football clubs established in 2019
I-League 2nd Division clubs
2019 establishments in Punjab, India 
Indian reserve football teams
Football academies in India
RoundGlass Punjab FC Reserves and Academy